Michael Edward Hudock, Jr. (September 29, 1934 – May 7, 2003) was an American football center. He helped the University of Miami to become a national football power for the first time. He went played in the American Football League as an original member of the New York Titans. He played high school football for the Tunkhannock Tigers, graduating in 1952.

College career
An offensive lineman and linebacker, Hudock was a sophomore in 1954 when the Miami Hurricanes finished No. 9 in the nation, the first time they ended a season top 10. In his senior year they were 8–1–1, No. 6 in all three wire polls and Hudock was named honorable mention All-American. Hudock was twice named first-team center for the All-South team in college football and was selected to play in the Chicago Charities College All-Star Game (an injury meant that he did not play). He had begun his college career at the University of Pittsburgh before transferring to Miami.

Professional career
Although his early professional years were plagued by knee injuries, Hudock became an integral part of another team's rise to prominence in 1960 when he joined the New York Titans for the first American Football League season. The Titans became the New York Jets in 1963 and in 1965 Hudock played for Joe Namath's rookie year. Taken by the Miami Dolphins in the 1966 AFL expansion draft, he retired in 1967 after he was traded to the Kansas City Chiefs.

He became an assistant high school football coach at Old Forge (Pa.), but returned to the Chiefs and played until the end of the season for their injured starting center.

Post-football career
Hudock later served as police chief in Tunkhannock Township, Pennsylvania.

See also
 List of American Football League players

References

1934 births
2003 deaths
American football centers
Kansas City Chiefs players
Miami Hurricanes football players
New York Jets players
New York Titans (AFL) players
People from Pittston, Pennsylvania
Players of American football from Pennsylvania
American Football League players
People from Wyoming County, Pennsylvania
Miami Dolphins players